This Side of Paradise is the debut novel by F. Scott Fitzgerald.

This Side of Paradise may also refer to:

 This Side of Paradise (album) or the title song, by Ric Ocasek
 This Side of Paradise (EP) or the title song, by Hayley Kiyoko
 "This Side of Paradise" (song), by Bryan Adams
 "This Side of Paradise", a song by Bree Sharp from the film Pokémon: Destiny Deoxys
 "This Side of Paradise", a song by Manfred Mann's Earth Band from The Roaring Silence
 "This Side of Paradise" (Star Trek: The Original Series), a television episode